The Cat and the Fiddle is a 1934 American pre-Code romantic musical film directed by William K. Howard based on the hit 1931 Broadway musical of the same name by Jerome Kern and Otto A. Harbach, about a romance between a struggling composer and an American singer. The film stars Ramon Novarro and Jeanette MacDonald in her MGM debut.

Plot
The film plot is substantially changed from that of the Broadway musical. Victor Florescu (Ramon Novarro) is a composer desperately trying to get his operetta to opening night. First his leading lady (Vivienne Segal) leaves, taking the bulk of their budget with her. Then the male lead splits, leaving Victor to fill his role. Next he calls upon an old love, songstress Shirley Sheridan (Jeanette MacDonald) to be his ingénue, but she insists that she is leaving the theater to marry her affluent, but unfaithful fiancé (Frank Morgan).

Cast
Ramon Novarro as Victor Florescu 
Jeanette MacDonald as Shirley Sheridan 
Frank Morgan as Jules Daudet 
Charles Butterworth as Charles 
Jean Hersholt as Professor Bertier 
Vivienne Segal as Odette Brieux 
Frank Conroy as The Theatre Owner 
Henry Armetta as the Taxi Driver 
Adrienne D'Ambricourt as Concierge 
Joseph Cawthorn as Rodolphe 'Rudy' Brieux
Sterling Holloway as Flower Messenger (uncredited)

Box office
The film grossed a total (domestic and foreign) of $1,099,000: $455,000 from the US and Canada and $644,000 elsewhere resulting in a loss of $142,000. The film was a box office disappointment for MGM.

Technicolor sequences
The final reel was filmed in the then newly perfected three-strip Technicolor process, previously used only in Walt Disney's Silly Symphonies cartoons.

Television View
This film received its initial television showings in Chicago 9 May 1957 on WBBM (Channel 2), followed by Philadelphia 13 May 1957 on WFIL (Channel 6); it first aired in New York City 24 June 1957 on WCBS (Channel 2), in Seattle 24 August 1957 on KING (Channel 5), in Los Angeles 12 September 1957 on KTTV (Channel 11), in Honolulu 29 September 1957 on KHVH (Channel 13), and in Norfolk VA 9 December 1957 on WTAR (Channel 3); in Portland OR it was first aired 28 April 1958 on KGW (Channel 8), and in San Francisco it was finally telecast 5 August 1959 on KGO (Channel 7). The finale in 3-strip Technicolor was not restored back into its original hues until the film was shown by Turner Classic Movies on TNT in the late 1980s.

References

External links

1930s color films
1930s musical comedy-drama films
1930s romantic comedy-drama films
1930s romantic musical films
1934 comedy films
1934 films
1934 drama films
American black-and-white films
American musical comedy-drama films
American romantic comedy-drama films
American romantic musical films
Early color films
1930s English-language films
Fictional couples
Films about composers
Films based on musicals
Films directed by Sam Wood 
Films directed by William K. Howard
Metro-Goldwyn-Mayer films
1930s American films